Dylan Arnold (born February 11, 1994) is an American actor.  He is known for playing Noah in the romantic drama After (2019), and its sequel After We Collided (2020),  Cameron Elam in Halloween (2018), and its sequel, Halloween Kills (2021), and Theo Engler in You (2021). On stage, he portrayed Justin in Roberto Aguirre-Sacasa's Good Boys and True at the Pasadena Playhouse in 2019.

Biography and career 
Born February 11, 1994 in Seattle, Washington, Arnold attended the University of North Carolina School of the Arts.

In November 2020, Arnold was cast in the main role of Theo Engler for the third season of the Netflix psychological thriller series You.

Filmography

Film and television

References

External links 
 

1994 births
21st-century American male actors
American male film actors
American male stage actors
Living people
Male actors from Seattle
Male actors from Washington (state)
University of North Carolina School of the Arts alumni